Isophrictis corsicella is a moth of the family Gelechiidae. It was described by Hans Georg Amsel in 1936. It is found in Spain and on Corsica and Sardinia.

References

Moths described in 1936
Isophrictis